Acmaeodera acanthicola is a species of metallic wood-boring beetle in the family Buprestidae. It is found in Central America and North America. Adult hosts include Prosopis and Parkinsonia, and larval host is Celtis.

References

Further reading

 
 
 
 
 

acanthicola
Beetles described in 1972